The Yio Chu Kang Single Member Constituency is a single member constituency (SMC) in the north-eastern area, Singapore. The current Member of Parliament is Yip Hon Weng of the People's Action Party (PAP).

Town council 
Yio Chu Kang SMC, alongside Kebun Baru SMC and Ang Mo Kio GRC, is managed by the Ang Mo Kio Town Council.

Members of Parliament

Electoral results

Elections in 1980s

Elections in 2000s

Elections in 2020s

References

 2020 General Election's result
1980 General Election's Result
1984 General Election's Result
1988 General Election's Result
2006 General Election's Result

1980 establishments in Singapore
1991 disestablishments in Singapore
2020 establishments in Singapore
Singaporean electoral divisions
Ang Mo Kio
Constituencies established in 1980
Constituencies disestablished in 1991
Constituencies established in 2020